Bryan Street is a prominent street in Savannah, Georgia, United States. Originally known only as Bryan Street singular, its addresses are now split between "West Bryan Street" and "East Bryan Street", the transition occurring at Bull Street in the center of the downtown area. Bryan Street is named for the Bryan family (brothers Hugh, Jonathan and Joseph), of South Carolina, who assisted James Edward Oglethorpe in establishing the Savannah colony. The street is entirely within Savannah Historic District, a National Historic Landmark District.

Bryan Street passes through six squares on their northern side. From west to east:

Franklin Square
Ellis Square
Johnson Square
Reynolds Square
Warren Square
Washington Square

Notable buildings and structures

Below is a selection of notable buildings and structures on Bryan Street, all in Savannah's Historic District. From west to east:

West Bryan Street
First Bryan Baptist Church, 575 West Bryan Street (1888)
Michael Alberino Property, 420 West Bryan Street (1912)
418 West Bryan Street (1910)
305 West Bryan Street (1855)
John L. Hardee Property, 22–24 West Bryan Street (1878)

East Bryan Street

Savannah Bank and Trust Co., 2 East Bryan Street (1911)
Ann Hamilton House, 24–26 East Bryan Street (circa 1824)
Abe's on Lincoln, 226 East Bryan Street (17 Lincoln Street) (1852)
John Eppinger (Estate of) Property, 404 East Bryan Street (1821–1823)
Patrick Shiels House, 410 East Bryan Street (1848)
Dennis O'Connell House, 416 East Bryan Street (1888)
Mary Driscoll House, 418 East Bryan Street (1898)
Margaret Prindible Property, 508–512 East Bryan Street (1892)
Mary Gildea House, 514 East Bryan Street (1899)
Mary Horrigan Property, 520–522 East Bryan Street (1899)

References

Roads in Savannah, Georgia
Streets in Georgia (U.S. state)